Yokesone Monastery is a historic Buddhist monastery in Sale, Magwe Region, Myanmar. The wooden monastery, which dates to 1882, is known for its abundance of woodcarvings which depict scenes of the Jataka tales.
The monastery was constructed with 153 teak posts, each more than 3 feet in diameter, which hold the building up about 10 feet above the ground, during the time of King Thibaw. It housed monks from its construction until it was transformed into a museum in 1996.  Aside from the carvings, guests can also view an ancient Buddha image and utensils of Yadanabon 19th century period. Additionally, the museum houses a plethora of unidentified sculptures, a large throne once used by leading monks, as well as an old wooden box that served as carriage for clergy members. Behind the monastery in a small building, work from the famous Burmese playwright and poet, as well as favorite bard in King Mindon's court, U Ponnya, also hailing from the area, are on display.

See also 

 Kyaung

References 

Monasteries in Myanmar
Buildings and structures in Magway Region
19th-century Buddhist temples
Religious buildings and structures completed in 1882